The 2012 Tampa Bay Buccaneers season was the franchise's 37th season in the National Football League. It was the first season under new head coach Greg Schiano after the former head coach Raheem Morris was fired due to the team's record of 4–12 last season. This is Ronde Barber's last season before retiring in the 2013 off-season.

Though the team did not make the postseason, the team improved their record to 7–9, and finished the regular season with team records in several statistical categories. The team set a franchise record with 5,820 yards of total offense and 389 total points scored. The defense ranked No. 1 in the league against the rush (82.5 yard/game), also a franchise record. Individual team records include most touchdown passes (27) and most passing yards (4,065) by Josh Freeman, as well as Doug Martin's team rookie rushing record of 1,454 yards. Martin finished with five games of 100+ yards rushing, including a breakout game against Oakland in week 9 rushing for 612 yards and five touchdowns. They also finished with the league's worst passing defense, allowing 4,758 yards (297 yard/game).

Offseason

2012 draft class 

The Buccaneers traded its 2011 & 2012 fourth-round selection to the Philadelphia Eagles in exchange for the Philadelphia Eagles 2011 fourth-round selection to select tight end Luke Stocker during the 2011 NFL draft. The Buccaneers were selected to draft a player in the third round of the 2012 NFL draft, until a trade with the Houston Texans that took place causing the team to trade their third-round selection to move up certain spots to acquire Lavonte David in the second round. Drake Dunsmore was the only rookie that did not make the 53-man roster during roster cuts. However, Drake Dunsmore did end up making the practice squad of the Buccaneers, but he decided later to retire on May 2, 2013.

Free Agent Acquisitions and Transactions 
 Note that each player under new members is currently on the 53-man active roster or on the reserve list.

Players that joined the team, as new members 

 Dan Orlovsky
 Vincent Jackson
 Jamon Meredith
 Carl Nicks
 Gary Gibson
 Eric Wright

Sources:  as of 12/30/2013 3:00 p.m. Pacific Time

Preseason 

The Buccaneers 2012 preseason schedule was announced on April 4, 2012. On August 25, Davin Joseph was placed on injured reserve with a season-ending knee injury. This occurred Week 2 of the preseason at home against the New England Patriots. The Buccaneers finished the 2012 preseason with a record of 2–2 under new head coach Greg Shiano.

Regular season

On opening day against Carolina, Ronde Barber started his 200th consecutive game as a member of the Tampa Bay Buccaneers. The 2002 Super Bowl team are reuniting in attendance for the home game against the Eagles in week 14. The Buccaneers finished the 2012 season with a record of 7–9 under new head coach Greg Schiano.

Season summary 
New head coach Greg Schiano installed a new regime and attitude at Tampa Bay upon his arrival. An improved offense set several team records and milestones, and the team ranked No. 1 in rushing defense in the NFL. A weak passing defense (32nd), however, and a five-game losing streak late in the season, saw the team ultimately fall from playoff contention.

Tampa Bay won on opening day, but lost three straight games to NFC East opponents in September. However, the team rebounded and won five of their next six games, primarily behind the breakout efforts of rookie running back Doug Martin. In week 8, the team raised eyebrows by winning a nationally televised Thursday night game against the playoff-bound Vikings, then followed it up by a stellar performance by Martin the following week. At Oakland in week 9, Martin rushed for 251 yards and four touchdowns, one of the most prolific statistical performances in NFL history. After a comeback overtime win at Carolina, the team sat at 6–4, and actually controlled their own destiny for a wild card playoff berth.

Late in November, however, the team began a slump, and fell from the playoff picture. A one-point loss against Atlanta, and a last-second loss versus Philadelphia were part of a five-game losing streak. The team rebounded and finished on a high note, beating the #1 seed Falcons on the road in the final week of the regular season. After a dismal 4–12 record in 2011, the team finished a fairly respectable 7–9 in 2012.

Game summaries

Week 1: vs. Carolina Panthers 

The Tampa Bay defense held Carolina to only 10 yards rushing, snapping a ten-game losing streak dating back to week 6 of the 2011 NFL season. Tampa Bay's last win was at home on October 16, 2011 against the Saints (26–20). Ronde Barber started his 200th consecutive game, finishing the game with a sack and an interception.

Week 2: at New York Giants 

Eli Manning threw for 510 yards, while the Tampa Bay defense allowed over 600 yards to the New York Giants' offense. This was the most offensive yards allowed in Buccaneers franchise history. Tampa Bay had the lead throughout the third quarter, but the Giants came back to win the game in the fourth quarter scoring 25 points. The Buccaneers allowed 96 rushing yards to the Giants.

Week 3: at Dallas Cowboys 

Aqib Talib intercepted Tony Romo on the fourth play of the game, which led to a Tampa Bay touchdown and an early lead 7–0 over the Cowboys. However, the Buccaneer offense sputtered, and failed to score on their next nine possessions. In the first 57 minutes of the game, Tampa Bay had only 96 net yards of offense. Adrian Clayborn injured his knee throughout the second half and was expected to miss the rest of the season after the Buccaneers placed him on injured reserve.

Week 4: vs. Washington Redskins 

The Buccaneers allowed 160 rushing yards to the Redskins. This was the first time Tampa Bay allowed a 100-yard rushing performance to any team this season. The Buccaneers came back late in the 4th quarter leading 22–21. However, the Redskins scored the winning field goal to take the win 24–22.

Week 6: vs. Kansas City Chiefs 

Josh Freeman threw for 328 yards and three touchdown passes, as Tampa Bay routed the Kansas City Chiefs 38–10. Tampa Bay had 463 yards of total offense, which was third best for a home game in franchise history. Brady Quinn started at quarterback for Kansas City for the injured Matt Cassel, who suffered a concussion in the previous week's game against the Ravens. During the third quarter, Ronde Barber returned a 78-yard interception for a touchdown. Barber has 12 career return touchdowns, which is tied for third all-time in NFL history. Barber now is the first player in NFL history with at least eight interceptions returned for touchdowns, four fumble recoveries returned for touchdowns and a punt return for a touchdown. Barber's eight career interceptions returned for touchdowns tied him for seventh in NFL history. Barber only needs one more return touchdown to tie Rod Woodson and Darren Sharper, who have 13 return touchdowns in their respected careers. Paul Gruber was inducted into Tampa Bay's Ring of Honor during halftime. Tampa Bay held the Chiefs to 80 rushing yards on 30 carries. Kansas City came into the game averaging 180.8 rushing yards a game, which ranked second in the NFL. Jamaal Charles was the #1 rushing leader in the NFL with 551 rushing yards coming into the game, but the Tampa Bay defense held Charles to only 40 rushing yards during the entire game.

Week 7: vs. New Orleans Saints 

Ronde Barber intercepted Drew Brees in the first quarter to record his 46th career interception. The Saints defense allowed over 500 offensive yards to the Buccaneers. Josh Freeman threw for a career-high 420 yards and 3 touchdowns. Tampa Bay defense held the Saints to 81 rushing yards. Vincent Jackson had 7 receptions for a franchise record 216 yards and a touchdown. Jackson had a 95-yard catch, but failed to score after Malcolm Jenkins tackled him from behind.

Trailing by seven points in the final two minutes, Freeman drove the Buccaneers deep into the red zone. On the final play of regulation, Freeman threw an apparent game-tying touchdown pass to Mike Williams in the back of the endzone as time expired. However, the touchdown did not count because it was determined that Williams had stepped out of bounds before making the catch. This was the first home game of the season that was not blacked out and televised locally, and the first Sunday afternoon game at home to not be blacked out since 2009.

Week 8: at Minnesota Vikings 

This win snapped a nine-game away losing streak for Tampa Bay dating back to last season. The Buccaneers last road win was against the Vikings in Minnesota in week 2 when the Bucs came back and won 24–20 after trailing 17–0 in the third quarter. Doug Martin held the spotlight on this night. Martin ran the ball 29 times for 135 rushing yards and a rushing touchdown. Martin scored two touchdowns on this night and he had 100 rushing yards before halftime. Adding to that, he caught three passes for 79 yards, in which he scored a 64-yard passing touchdown on a screen play. Martin's 214 total offensive yards is the 5th best single game total in Buccaneer history. Buccaneer QB Josh Freeman had his third consecutive game with three touchdown passes, in which is a new franchise record. Freeman threw for 262 yards and has a streak of consecutive games with a touchdown pass with 10. There were three takeaways in the game, all of them belonging to the Tampa Bay defense.  Ronde Barber and Michael Bennett forced fumbles, with the Bucs recovering both of them in the second quarter.  Those turnovers were converted into points. This provided the difference in the Bucs 20–10 halftime lead over the Vikings.  Leonard Johnson also ended Minnesota's last drive with an interception. Negative plays tackles behind the line of scrimmage have become the Buccaneers’ strength this season. They entered Week 8 leading the NFL in that category.  The hits kept coming Thursday night as Tampa Bay had seven more tackles for loss, including three sacks. The Tampa Bay defense allowed Adrian Peterson and the Minnesota offense to rush for 141 total rushing yards. The Vikings were the second team this season to rush over 100 yards as the Redskins were the first team to do so with Robert Griffen III. The Buc's offensive line only allowed 1 sack to Jared Allen and the defense. Doug Martin carried the load, becoming the first player in Buccaneers history with 135 rushing yards and 75 receiving yards in the same game. The Bucs finished with 416 yards of total offense. They had 513 yards against New Orleans last Sunday and 463 yards against Kansas City the previous week before playing the Saints. That marks the first time in franchise history that the Bucs have had three straight games with over 400 yards of total offense. The Buccaneers won their sixth straight meeting against the Minnesota Vikings.

Week 9: at Oakland Raiders 

Doug Martin rushed for 251 yards and four touchdowns. Martin became the first player in NFL history to have 250+ rushing yards and four touchdowns in a single game. He also became the first player in NFL history to have rushing touchdowns of 70+, 65+, and 45+ yards in the same game. Martin's 251 yards rushing broke the single-game franchise record previously held by James Wilder Sr. (219) from 1983. Martin had 272 total scrimmage yards, including an additional 21 yard receiving. Martin's 251 rushing yards was tied for third-most by a rookie in NFL history. Adrian Peterson (296 yards) in 2007 and DeMarco Murray (253) in 2011 were the only rookies to rush for more yards in a game. Martin's four rushing touchdowns was also a new franchise record.

Josh Freeman passed for 247 yards and two touchdowns. He is the third quarterback in franchise history to throw for a touchdown pass in each of the first eight games of the season. Brad Johnson (2003) and Doug Williams (1979) were the other two. Tampa Bay's 515 yards from offense ranked second on the team's all-time list. The record was 573 in a 1980 game against Minnesota. LaVonte David set a Tampa Bay single-game rookie record with 16 tackles. Ahmad Black and E. J. Biggers both had an interception and a forced fumble in the game. Leonard Johnson had another interception, which was two consecutive games with interceptions. DaQuan Bowers and Michael Bennett each had a sack. The Buccaneers added six tackles for a loss which remains best in the NFL. The Tampa Bay defense held the Raiders rushing offense to 22 total rushing yards. This was the fourth game of the season in which the Buccaneers scored more than 30 points in a single game (Giants 34, Chiefs 38, Vikings 36, and Raiders 42). The victory was the first time Tampa Bay defeated the Raiders in Oakland.

Week 10: vs. San Diego Chargers 

The Buccaneers scored a touchdown on offense, defense, and special teams. The last time the Buccaneers did this was on October 18, 2009, home against the Carolina Panthers when Cadillac Williams scored an offensive touchdown, Tanard Jackson returned an interception for a touchdown, and Sammie Stroughter returned a kick-off return for a touchdown. Josh Freeman threw for 210 yards and 2 touchdowns. Freeman completed 14 passes out 20 attempts. Freeman had another consecutive game without throwing an interception. Dallas Clark caught a three-yard touchdown. Tiquan Underwood caught a 15-yard touchdown. Rookie Leonard Johnson scored an 83-yard interception touchdown. This is the third consecutive game that Leonard Johnson had an interception. Adam Hayward recovered and returned a 29-yard touchdown of a punt that Dekoda Watson blocked. Daniel Te'o-Nesheim and Mason Foster each had a sack. LeQuan Lewis had an interception as well. Doug Martin had 68 rushing yards and 51 receiving yards which combined for a total of 119 total yards of offense. With this performance Martin broke the NFL record for most yards from scrimmage (605) in a 3-game span set by Walter Payton in 1977 (593). Rookie Lavonte David led the team in tackles with 13. Connor Barth scored 2 field goals. The Tampa Bay defense allowed San Diego to rush over 103 yards on offense. The Chargers were the third team this season to rush over 100 yards on the Tampa Bay defense. The Redskins and Vikings were the other two teams to do so.

Week 11: at Carolina Panthers 

The Tampa Bay Buccaneers walked out of Bank of America Stadium with perhaps one of the most impressive comeback wins in their franchise history. Quarterback Josh Freeman threw for 248 yards and 3 touchdowns. Freeman threw 2 interceptions in this game as well. Nate Byham caught a 3-yard pass for a touchdown for the Bucs in the first quarter. Connor Barth scored 2 field goals in this game. Late in the fourth quarter, Vincent Jackson caught a 24-yard pass for a touchdown with 12 seconds left. Jackson caught the two-point conversion to tie the game. Dallas Clark caught a 15-yard pass for a touchdown that won the game for the Buccaneers in overtime. Doug Martin rushed for 138 yards. Martin surpassed 1,000 rushing yards in 10 games as a rookie. Michael Bennett and Da'Quan Bowers each registered a sack. The Tampa Bay defense held Carolina to 97 rushing yards. The Buccaneers swept their division rival Carolina Panthers this season.

Week 12: vs. Atlanta Falcons 

Josh Freeman threw for 256 yards and didn't throw an interception. Doug Martin had 50 rushing yards, but scored the only 2 offensive touchdowns for the Buccaneers. Ronde Barber intercepted Matt Ryan in the second quarter, his 47th career interceptions. Connor Barth made 3 out of 4 field goal attempts. Barth hit from 22, 42 and 48 yards out, missing a 56-yard try in the 4th quarter. E. J. Biggers sacked and forced Matt Ryan to fumble in the 4th quarter in which Gerald McCoy recovered. Biggers had the only sack for the Buccaneers defense. Defensively, Lavonte David again led the Buccaneers in tackles with eight total tackles. The Tampa Bay defense held the Falcons to only 79 rushing yards.

Week 13: at Denver Broncos 

Josh Freeman threw for 242 yards and 2 touchdowns. Freeman threw an interception to Von Miller in the third quarter, in which he ran it back for a touchdown. Freeman fumbled once in which Von Miller forced. Connor Barth scored 3 field goals. Barth scored from 31, 50, and 55 yards. Doug Martin rushed for only 56 yards. Dallas Clark caught an 11-yard passing touchdown in the first quarter. Mike Williams caught a 5-yard passing touchdown in the fourth quarter. Rookie linebacker Lavonte David led the team once again in tackles and also intercepted Peyton Manning in the third quarter. The Tampa Bay defense held Denver to 91 rushing yards.

Week 14: vs. Philadelphia Eagles 

The 2002 Tampa Bay Buccaneers Super Bowl championship team reunited in attendance for the game. During halftime, a ceremony was held to honor the reunited 2002 Super Bowl team. More than 50 players and coaches from the 2002 Super Bowl team gathered to celebrate the 10-year anniversary of the Tampa Bay Buccaneers' first ever Super Bowl Championship. Among those who attended the reunion were former head coach Jon Gruden, former defensive coordinator Monte Kiffin, Derrick Brooks, John Lynch, Warren Sapp, Brad Johnson, Mike Alstott, and Keyshawn Johnson. Ronde Barber was part of the 2002 Super Bowl team, but was playing on the field for Tampa Bay. Josh Freeman threw for 189 yards and 2 touchdowns. Doug Martin rushed for 128 yards and scored a rushing touchdown during the fourth quarter. Martin broke Cadillac William's rookie rushing yard record during the game. Vicent Jackson had 131 receiving yards. In the third quarter, Mike Williams caught a 1-yard pass from Freeman. In the fourth quarter, Jackson caught a 13-yard pass from Freeman. The Tampa Bay defense held the eagles offense to only 29 total rushing yards. The Tampa Bay defense had 6 sacks throughout the game. Lavonte David had a sack, Daniel Teo-nesheim had a sack, Michael Bennett had two sacks, and Gerald McCoy had two as well. Ronde Barber led the team in tackles.

Week 15: at New Orleans Saints 

Josh Freeman threw for 279 yards, no touchdowns, and threw 4 interceptions. Doug Martin rushed for a season low 16 yards. On defense, Daquan Bowers had the only sack. Mark Barron led the team in tackles. The Tampa Bay defense allowed the Saints to rush for 149 yards. The Buccaneers were shut out throughout the entire game. The last shut out the Buccaneers had was during week 3 of the 2009 season, when the New York Giants beat the Buccaneers 24–0. More importantly the loss mathematically eliminated the Buccaneers from playoff contention.

Week 16: vs. St. Louis Rams 

Josh Freeman threw for 372 yards, one touchdown, and four interceptions. Doug Martin rushed for 62 yards. Connor Barth scored two field goals throughout the game. Barth scored from 29 and 49 yards. Mike Williams scored the only touchdown in the third quarter in which he caught a pass for 61 yards. Mike Williams and Vicent Jackson both had 100 receiving yards throughout the game. On defense, Lavonte David led the team in tackles with 9 total tackles. Leonard Johnson forced a fumble. Danny Grorer had an interception. The Tampa Bay defense held the Rams offense to only 89 total rushing yards.

Week 17: at Atlanta Falcons 

Josh Freeman threw for 222 yards, a touchdown, and an interception. Freeman is the first ever quarterback in franchise history to throw for 4,000 yards in a season. Freeman ended the season with 27 passing touchdowns in a season which was another record in franchise history. Doug Martin rushed for 142 yards. Martin scored a 40-yard rushing touchdown in the third quarter. Mike Williams caught an 8-yard pass from Freeman in the second quarter. Connor Barth scored 3 field goals throughout the game. Barth scored from 22, 42, and 48 yards. On defense, Mason Foster led the team in tackles with 11 total tackles. Lavonte David had a sack and Daniel Te'o-Neshiem had a sack as well in the game. Dekoda Watson blocked a punt in the second quarter. The Tampa Bay defense held the Falcons offense to only 65 rushing yards. The Bucs finished 7–9 with the win, improving on their 4–12 record from 2011.

Standings

Awards 
 Week 1: Ronde Barber was named NFC Defensive Player of the Week.
 Week 8: Doug Martin was named NFL Ground Player of the Week.
 October: Doug Martin was named NFL Offensive Rookie of the Month.
 Week 9: Doug Martin
 Named NFC Offensive Player of the Week.
 Named NFL Ground Player of the Week.
 Named NFL Rookie of the Week.
 Week 11: Doug Martin was named NFL Ground Player of the Week.
 November: Lavonte David was named NFL Defensive Rookie of the Month.
 November: Dekoda Watson was named NFC Special Teams Player of the Month.

Staff

Final roster

Notes and references

External links 
 Buccaneers.com – Official site

Tampa Bay Buccaneers season
Tampa Bay Buccaneers
21st century in Tampa, Florida
Tampa Bay Buccaneers seasons